Malik Ahmad Ali Aulakh is a Pakistani politician who had been a member of the Provincial Assembly of the Punjab from August 2018 till January 2023.

Political career

He was elected to the Provincial Assembly of the Punjab as an independent candidate from Constituency PP-280 (Layyah-I) in 2018 Pakistani general election.

References

Living people
Year of birth missing (living people)